Knema hookeriana (sometimes misspelled K. hookerana) is a species of plant in the family Myristicaceae. It is a tree found in Sumatra, Peninsular Malaysia, Singapore, and Thailand.

The Latin specific epithet hookeriana refers to William Jackson Hooker.

References

hookeriana
Trees of Sumatra
Trees of Malaya
Trees of Thailand
Vulnerable plants
Taxonomy articles created by Polbot
Taxobox binomials not recognized by IUCN